M69 or M-69 may refer to:

 M-69 (Michigan highway), a state highway in Michigan
 M69 motorway, a motorway in England
 Marine Highway 69, a designation of the Gulf Intracoastal Waterway which runs along the Texas coastline
 Miles M.69 Marathon, an aircraft
 Messier 69, a globular cluster in the constellation Sagittarius
 M69 Grenade A training grenade
 M-69 Incendiary cluster bomb